Pigeon shooting is a type of live bird wing shooting competition. Traditionally, there are two types of competition: box birds and columbaire. In box birds, the pigeons are held in a mechanical device that releases them when the shooter calls out. In columbaire, the birds are hand thrown by a person when called upon. The pigeons are bred for speed. The most common species of pigeon used in regulated shooting contests is known as a zurito (Columba oenas). In the shooting competition, large sums of money are gambled and winners can have purses exceeding US$50,000. The equipment for the sport can be specialized and purpose-built.

In the past, the sport was popular worldwide. It was primarily a sport of the upper class and was held at resort locations such as Monaco and Havana. Popular magazines have covered the sport—for example, Field & Stream and Sports Illustrated But, over time, the sport has fallen out of widespread favor due to costs, alternative shooting sports such as trap shooting, skeet shooting, and sporting clays, and animal rights activism over a blood sport. Proponents of the sport argue that live pigeons are more challenging to shoot than clay targets. Many claim that pigeon shoots are no more cruel than extermination efforts carried out in cities where feral pigeons are considered a nuisance and are often controlled using lethal methods. The United States Department of Agriculture euthanizes over 60,000 pigeons a year in response to complaints.

In the past, events used to be publicly posted. The sport still exists in pockets around the world, but generally, it is not well publicized and it is only hosted in select locations, such as private gun clubs typically by invitation only.

In the United States live pigeon shoots have been held on large privately owned ranches and plantations in the South. Usually, this is to avoid the attention of protesters inevitably attracted by the events. Animal rights activists have begun deploying drones in an attempt to disrupt live pigeon competitions. In the past, U.S. Senator Jim Inhofe held annual live pigeon shoots in Oklahoma as part of a political fundraiser. In 2015 a drone operated by an animal rights group was shot down while flying over Inhofe's fundraiser that was being held at a remote ranch. In 2017 due to protests from animal rights groups Inhofe replaced his annual live pigeon shoot with a wild dove hunt.

Venues and championships 

Tournaments and competition during beginning to mid-twentieth century were worldwide. In the 1900 Paris Olympics, live pigeon shooting was one of the events. The prize for the winner was 20,000 French Francs (more than US$82,000 in 2017), though the top four finishers agreed to split the prize money.

Early to mid-20th century 

The following table shows the host cities and winners of the pigeon-shooting world championships:

A brief list of some of the active venues in the 1950s:
 Estoril, Portugal - Match of Nations World Championship
 Monte Carlo, Monaco - Prix de Larvotto and Prix Gaston Rambaud
 Havana, Cuba - The Pan American Live Pigeon Championship, The Grand Prix
 Vichy, France - Grand Prix de Vichy
 Lebanon, Pennsylvania - Miller Memorial 
 Hegins, Pennsylvania - Fred Coleman Memorial
 Deauville, France - Prix Roger Dubut
 Paris, France
 Rome, Italy
 Milan, Italy
 Madrid, Spain - Live Bird Championship
 San Remo, Italy
 Valencia, Spain
 Barcelona, Spain - Columbaire Championship
 Seville, Spain - Columbaire Championship
 Guadalajara, Mexico - Open Flyer Championship
 Mexico City, Mexico - World Live Pigeon Championship 
 Cairo, Egypt - Match of Nations

In Monte Carlo: 1872 to 1960 

Pigeon shooting in Monaco dates back to 1872. The ring was located behind the casino and was in continuous use with live pigeons until 1960, when robotic devices went into use. Slowly, shooting faded out of fashion, and the shooting range was demolished in 1972. After the ring was demolished, a mosaic titled "From the Earth to the Sea" ("De la Terre a la Mer") was installed by Victor Vasarely.

The popularity of pigeon shooting at Monte Carlo included creation of new types of gun stocks; the "Monte Carlo" comb.

The Olympics 

Pigeon shooting was a part of the 1900 Olympic Games in Paris, but has not been included other times.

In Pennsylvania

Pigeon shooting in the U.S. state of Pennsylvania dates back to the mid-19th century.  The Philadelphia Gun Club overlooking the Delaware River in Bensalem, Pennsylvania, is one of the oldest gun clubs in the United States. Founded in 1877 at the height of the Gilded Age the club opened to many socially prominent gentlemen and their ladies. In 1895 the club acquired the historic Bickley Mansion for use as a club house. The club currently has 61 members.

The club attracted many wealthy American sportsmen including several members of the Vanderbilt Family. William Kissam Vanderbilt II and Harry Payne Whitney who married Gertrude Vanderbilt in 1896 were both members.  Edward Burd Grubb Jr. a former Union Army General, businessman and New Jersey politician who was appointed as United States Ambassador to Spain by Benjamin Harrison, and was a close associate of Woodrow Wilson was an early president of the club.  In addition to the shooting range the club also had a boathouse on the river, and kennels for hunting dogs. Annie Oakley and her then employer, Buffalo Bill attended shoots at the Philadelphia Gun Club around the turn of the century.

In 1928, outdoor writer and conservationist Nash Buckingham, who contributed many articles to Field and Stream, shot his famous A.H. Fox waterfowl gun, "Bo Whoop", that had been custom built in Philadelphia by gunsmith Burt Becker at the club, as a guest of the magazine's publisher. In the 1930s and 1940s, club members and guests included notables such as writer Ernest Hemingway, who also participated in live pigeon shoots in Europe and Cuba, and Canadian jazz musician Charles Biddle.

The controversy surrounding live pigeon shoots at the Philadelphia Gun Club goes back more than a century. A club member was convicted for cruelty to animals for participating in a pigeon shoot in 1887. His conviction was eventually overturned by the Pennsylvania Supreme Court in 1891.

Pigeon shoots are also held at several other private gun clubs in Berks and Dauphin counties.

For more than half a century, a public pigeon shoot was held every Labor Day in Hegins, Pennsylvania.  Held annually from 1934 to 1998, this live pigeon shoot, known as the Fred Coleman Memorial shoot, once drew around 10,000 people. It was finally called off in 1999 following years of protests by animal rights activists and a legal battle that ultimately went all the way to the Pennsylvania Supreme Court.

Current locations 
 Casa de Campo, Dominican Republic 
 Guadalajara, Mexico
 Spain
 Bensalem, Pennsylvania, US
 Dalmatia, Pennsylvania, US
 Hamburg, Pennsylvania, US
 Henderson, Maryland, US
 Lykens, Pennsylvania, US

Firearms and ammunition 

Traditionally, live pigeon shooting guns were heavier than a regular field gun (greater than 7 pounds). Characteristics of them were longer barrels (30-inch with ventilated ribs give better sight plane), tighter chokes (full/fuller), no safety, beavertail forend, single triggers, clipped fences, a third bite, chambered for 2 3/4 inch 12 gauge shells instead of the 2 1/2-inch 12-gauge shells that were commonly used for hunting in the 19th and early 20th centuries. These extra features were in place to handle the higher pressure loads used for live pigeon competitions where the bird had to be dropped inside the ring. Today, these pigeon guns command a higher premium at auction.

Pigeons used 

In Europe, a special breed of rock pigeon is used called a zurito (Columba oenas) (see stock dove). They are small, gray, and exceptionally fast. In the United States feral pigeons captured in urban areas such as New York City, where they are considered a nuisance, have been used as targets for live pigeon shoots.

Animal rights criticism 
Live pigeon shooting was once the sport of aristocrats in Britain, but was largely abandoned around the turn of the 20th century and the sport was banned in the United Kingdom in 1921. Opposition to the sport in the United States began in the late 19th century. In 1887 Women’s Humane Society and American Anti-Vivisection Society founder Caroline Earle White successfully prosecuted Philadelphia Gun Club live pigeon shooter A. Nelson Lewis.  Convicted of cruelty in January 1890, Lewis appealed his case all the way to the Pennsylvania Supreme Court, which overturned the his conviction, ruling in 1891 that live pigeon shoots are a form of hunting and that pigeons are game birds. As early as the first quarter of the 20th century, editorial pieces began decrying the sport. John Goodwin, director of animal cruelty policy with The Humane Society of the United States, has criticized pigeon shooting.

In the USA live pigeon shooting remains legal but the popularity of the sport has waned considerably since the mid-20th century. It is specifically prohibited by statute in 14 states and has been determined to violate the animal cruelty statutes of nine more. In Pennsylvania, where gun clubs have hosted pigeon shoots since before the Civil War, live pigeon shooting is specifically exempt from animal cruelty laws. A 2014 bill for banning pigeon shooting was opposed by the National Rifle Association of America.  Legislators were apparently convinced and let the bill expire. In 2015, Pennsylvania Senator Patrick M. Browne re-introduced Senate Bill 715  to amend Title 18 (Crimes and Offenses) to further provide for the offense of animal cruelty.

See also
 Clay pigeon shooting
 Trap shooting
 List of medalists at the European Shotgun Championships (European Championships of Pigeon Shooting from 1929 to 1954)
 Pigeon racing at the 1900 Summer Olympics

References

Shotgun shooting sports
Animal welfare and rights legislation in the United States
Columbidae